Kärlekens språk (or Kärlekens språk 2000) is a 2004 Swedish sex educational film directed by Anders Lennberg.

The title is a reference to the 1969 sex educational film Ur kärlekens språk (Language of Love).

Cast
 Regina Lund
 Jan Mybrand
 Bert-Åke Varg
 Kim Anderzon
 Themba Tainton
 Maj-Briht Bergström-Walan
 Katerina Janouch
 Arne Weise
 Emma Tomasdotter Åberg
 Helena Lindblom
 Martin Hedman
 Sanna B. Danell
 Julia Klingener
 Emil Ahlén
 Mejdi Zoghlami
 Charly Wassberg Borbos
 Rick Petrini
 Sascha Zacharias
 Jeremy Wan
 Alex Levén
 Hanna Axelsson
 Elvira Castillo Åkerblom
 Joakim Ehrenberg
 Helena Thunell
 Thomas Olofsson
 Sara Sjögren
 Peter Lindén
 Seija Runsten
 Cissi Centerwall
 Michelle Meadows
 Jan Näpärä
 Gustav Söderberg
 Emma Hallin
 Sara Karlsson
 Micke Kazarnowicz
 Jane Nord
 Ebbe Damm
 Johan Karlsson
 Johan Westberg
 Joakim Karlsson
 Malin Westerholm
 Charles Murelius
 Ingemar Nord
 Therése Neaimé
 Micke Folke
 Sandy Mansson

Production
The scene in which Regina Lund as Stella Måne has oral sex with her wheelchair-using boss, played by Jan Mybrand, was so hot that the filmmakers felt compelled to cut out several parts of the sequence. "We never wanted to make a pornographic film and that was one of the reasons why it was cut," said producer Inge Ivarsson.

References

External links
 
 

Swedish erotic films
Teensploitation
2000s Swedish films